Blood Is Bright is the second EP by American art rock band Junius. It was originally released on January 1, 2006, through Radar Recordings. The EP was released as a remastered version by Pelagic Records in 2020.

Track listing

Personnel

Junius
Joseph E. Martinez – guitar, vocals
Michael Repasch-Nieves – guitar
Kieffer Infantino – bass
Dana Filloon – drums

Production
Will Benoit – production
Nick Zampiello – mastering

References

External links

2006 EPs
Junius (band) albums